Bolano is a comune (municipality) in the Province of La Spezia in the Italian region Liguria, located about  southeast of Genoa and about  northeast of La Spezia.

Bolano borders the following municipalities: Aulla, Follo, Podenzana, Santo Stefano di Magra, Tresana, Vezzano Ligure.

Famous people from Bolano
Marco Lucchinelli, motorcycle road racer
Massimo Podenzana, road bicycle racer

Demographic evolution

References

External links
 www.comune.bolano.sp.it/

Cities and towns in Liguria